Gyobingauk is a small town and seat of Gyobingauk Township, Tharrawaddy District, in the Bago Region of southern-central Burma. It lies approximately 10 kilometres north of Okpho along National Highway 2. It is located roughly 185 kilometres north of Yangon. The town has a Roman Catholic history with missionaries. It was reorganized in 1951 as the city headquarters.  It is said that the city was named after GyoBinGauk because of buckling Gyo Tree's location at long times ago.

Notable people
U WinTin (HanTharwady) 1930-2014 - journalist
Tay Za (1967-) - businessman

References

External links
Maplandia World Gazetteer

Populated places in Tharrawaddy District
Township capitals of Myanmar
Gyobingauk Township